Peter Nelson Lapan (June 25, 1891 – January 5, 1953) was an American professional baseball player.  He was a catcher over parts of two seasons (1922–23) with the Washington Senators.  For his career, he compiled a .306 batting average and one home run in 40 at-bats, with six runs batted in.

He was born in Easthampton, Massachusetts and died in Norwalk, California at the age of 61.

External links

1891 births
1953 deaths
People from Easthampton, Massachusetts
Washington Senators (1901–1960) players
Major League Baseball catchers
Baseball players from Massachusetts
Tacoma Tigers players
Los Angeles Angels (minor league) players
Seattle Rainiers players
Galveston Pirates players
Little Rock Travelers players
Memphis Chickasaws players
New Orleans Pelicans (baseball) players
Wichita Falls Spudders players
Omaha Packers players
San Antonio Indians players
Birmingham Barons players
Shreveport Sports players